The Rajput resistance to Muslim conquests or Rajput opposition to Islamic invasions was a series of military resistance by several ruling Rajput houses of northern and western India against the Arab Caliphate invasions from Middle East and
Islamic invaders of Central Asia in Medieval India. Before the Muslim conquests in the Indian subcontinent, much of northern and western India was being ruled by Rajput dynasties, who were a collection of martial Hindu families. The Rajput kingdoms contended with the rising and expansionist empires of the Muslim world, be they Arabs, Persians, Sayyids, Turks, Pashtuns, or Mughals. The Rajputs held out against the Caliphates and Central Asian empires for several centuries.

Background

The Rajputs rose to political prominence after the large empires of ancient India broke into smaller ones. The Rajputs became prominent in the early medieval period in about seventh century and dominated in regions now known as Rajasthan, Delhi, Haryana, Western Gangetic plains and Bundelkhand. The first of the major Rajput-ruled kingdoms was the Pratihara kingdom, with their centre at Ujjain and later at Kannauj. After the fall of the dynasty, several petty Rajput kingdoms became prominent in the region. An example of these were the Chauhans, who established themselves in the Sambhar, Jalor and other adjoining areas. The Guhilas (later Sisodias) established themselves in the Mewar region with their capital at Chittor. The Paramaras established themselves in the Dhar region while the Chandelas and Gahadavals established themselves in the Jejabhukti and Varanasi regions. The Tomaras established and founded the city of Delhi, which was later conquered by the Chauhans.

Early Invasion by Arabs and Caliphate
The Arabs, under the influence of the newly formed religion of Islam, began their political expansion during the life of Muhammad, the founder of Islam. By the seventh century, the Islamic State under Khalifas (Caliphs) spread all over Arabia, West Asia, North Africa and eastern Europe. They had conquered the ancient civilization of Persians and Egypt and had reached up to South Spain. In 711 A.D, Muhammad ibn Qasim, an Arab military commander of the Umayyad Caliphate defeated and executed Raja Dahir in the battle fought near Aror. The Arabs thus successfully conquered Sindh and Multan. There were several battles fought between the Arabs and the Rajputs. The one Rajput dynasty that came most in conflict with and repeatedly defeated the Arabs was that of the (Pratihara dynasty) . Under Nagabhata I, the Rajputs fought off an Arab invasion from Sindh, probably led by Junayd ibn Abd al-Rahman al-Murri or Al Hakam ibn Awana. Mewar under Bappa Rawal and later Khoman-II also fought off several Arab invasions.

Rajput Resistance to early invasions 
Bappa Rawal as the head of the Rajput confederacy defeated the Arab invasion as he led an army with representation from almost all of the dynasties of northern India, The Chauhan's  of Ajmer, The Tomar's of Delhi, Tak of Ahor, Chandel's of Kalinjir, Guhil forces of Nagda (Udaipur), Chittorgarh forces of Maan Mori, Solanki of Patan, Bhati of Bhatner (Punjab), Katoch of Jammu, Chavda of Gujarat - all sent their forces towards this force under Bappa Rawal. Similar confederacy were later made multiple times - importantly under Khoman of Mewar in the 8th century and under Jaipal Tuar of Delhi in the 9th century. The infighting amongst Rajputs eventually made north India very weak in the 10th century.

Ghaznavid invasion

After the ninth century, the Turks, newly converted to Islam, had grown to become more powerful than the Arabs. The Ghaznavids under Mahmud Ghaznavi began their expansion in the Indian frontier. In the wake of collapse of the Gurjara Pratiharas, he raided India seventeen times, demolishing several temples and massacring civilians. Mahmud conquer Punjab after defeating Kabul Shahis and undertook three expeditions into the Ganga Valley. The sole purpose of these raids were to loot wealth for his further Central Asian campaigns. By the end of 1015, Mahmud aided by his feudatory rulers crossed the foothills of Himalayas and defeated a local Rajput king at Baran in modern western Uttar Pradesh, Moving towards Mathura, he was opposed by Kalachuri ruler Kokkala-II, one of the major Rajput rulers of the area. The battle was hotly contested however Mahmud won the day and further plunders down several temples in Mathura. Mahmud conquered Kanauj in 1021 AD by defeating Kanauj King Chandella Gauda. Afterwards, Mahmud ransacked over wealthy Kanauj, then capital of Pratiharas.  By the early 1020s the Rajput rulers at Gwalior and Kalinjar were able to hold off assaults by Maḥmūd, although the two cities did pay him heavy tribute.

In 1025 A.D, he demolished and looted the Somnath Temple and its Rajput ruler Bhimdev Solanki fled his capital Anahilapataka  The Rajput king Paramar Bhoj of Malwa assembled an army to attack him. However, Mahmud avoided the confrontation and never returned to India again.

Mahmmud during this campaigns successfully captured the Punjab region and thus became first Islamic invader to capture North-Western India. Over the next 160 years, the Turks did not invade India and did not expand their domain beyond the Punjab region. In later half of the twelfth century, Ghaznavids power declined rapidly and they lost their control over Central and West Asian territories. Despite the fact, The Rajputs never showed strategic insights and did not present a unified singular attack to recapture Punjab and North West frontier from  Ghanzavids who ruled this area had become weak and it was from them that Shihabuddin Ghori captured Punjab and then invaded domain of Rajputs in 1191.

Ghorid invasion

By the end of twelfth century, Ghorids under Shihabuddin Ghori defeated and executed the last of Ghaznavid rulers and captured their region along with plundering Ghazna, the capital of Ghaznavids.

The Ghorids, led by Shihabuddin Ghori, first attacked India in 1178, where he was defeated by the Rajput Confederation led by Mularaja Solanki and Naiki Devi in Battle of Kasahrada fought near Gujarat. He then came in conflict with the Chauhans of Ajmer and Delhi. By the end of 1190, Shihabuddin Ghori captured Bathinda, which formed a part of Chauhan's territory. In 1191, the Rajput king of Ajmer and Delhi, Prithviraj Chauhan, unified several Rajput states and decisively defeated the invading army of Shihabuddin Ghori near Taraori in the First Battle of Tarain. Shihabuddin returned, and in spite of being outnumbered, decisively defeated the Rajput Confederacy of Prithviraj on the same battlefield in the Second Battle of Tarain. Prithviraj fled the battleground but was captured shortly after and was executed. Malesi, a Kachwaha Rajput of Jaipur, lead the last stand for Rajputs against the Ghorids after Prithviraj's escape. In few years time by 1194, Shihabuddin advanced towards Kannauj and Banaras and defeated Jaichand (another major Rajput king of the time) in Battle of Chandawar despite being outnumbered again, Ghorids plundered down Varanasi (capital of Gahadavals) and destroyed several temples there. By 1198, Ghorids conquered Kannauj too. Shihabuddin left his conquests in India to his able Slave general Qutb ud Din Aibak and returned to Khorasan.

The defeat of Rajputs was an important moment in medieval India's history as it not only shattered Rajput powers in the Indo-Gangetic Plain but also laid the foundation of Turkish rule in Ganga Valley.

Following the battle, the Delhi Sultanate became prominent in the region and the collapse of organised Rajput resistance in northern India led to Muslim control of the region within a generation. However, Rajputs under the brief and able rule of Rana Sanga turned their traditional territory of Mewar into a powerful kingdom of north India.

Delhi Sultanate

Mamluk Dynasty
During the reign of Iltutmish, the Rajput states of Kalinjar, Bayana, Gwalior, Ranthambore and Jalore rebelled against the Turkish governors and gained independence. In 1226, Iltutmish led an army to recapture the lost territories. He was successful in capturing Ranthambore, Jalore, Bayana and Gwalior. However, he was unable to conquer Gujarat, Malwa and Baghelkhand. Iltutmish also attempted an attack on Nagda, then capital of Mewar, but was repelled by the combined army of Mewar and Gujarat (under the Chalukyas). After Iltutmish's death, the Rajput states once again rebelled, and the Bhati Rajputs, who were entrenched in Mewat, conquered the areas around Delhi.

Khilji Dynasty
Sultan Ala ud din Khilji, who ruled between 1296 and 1316, conquered Gujarat in 1297, Malwa in 1305, and captured the fort of Mandu and handed it over to the Songara Chouhans. They captured the fortresses of Ranthambore in 1301, Mewar's capital at Chittorgarh in 1303, and Jalore in 1311, after long sieges with fierce resistance from their Rajput defenders. Khilji also fought the Bhatti Rajputs of Jaisalmer and occupied the Golden Fort. He managed to capture three Rajput forts, Chitor, Ranthambore, Siwana and Jaisalmer, but could not hold them for long. Alauddin despatched his generals against Karan Waghela, the Rajput ruler of Gujarat, who fled with his daughter to the court of Rai Ramachandra of Devagiri, where he was received cordially. However, Kamla Devi, the wife of ruler was captured by the invaders and she was married to Alauddin. In a bid to capture Karan Waghela, the army of sultanate attacked Devgiri under the generalship of Malik Kafur, the slave general of Alauddin. Ramchandra, the ruler of Devgiri was defeated and Deval Devi, the daughter of Rajput ruler Karan Waghela, was captured and brought to Delhi. Alauddin married Deval Devi to his son Khizar Khan.

Tuglaq Dynasty
Under Rana Hammir, the Mewar reestablished their supremacy within 20 years of the sack of Chittorgarh. In 1336, Hammir defeated Muhammad Tughlaq in the Battle of Singoli, with the Hindu Charans as his main allies, and captured him. Tughlaq had to pay a huge ransom and relinquish all of Mewar's lands for his freedom. Following this, the Delhi Sultanate did not attack Chittorgarh for a few hundred years. The Rajputs reestablished their independence, and Rajput states were established as far east as Bengal and north into the Punjab. The Tomaras established themselves at Gwalior, and the ruler Man Singh Tomar built the fortress which still stands there. Mewar emerged as the leading Rajput state, and Rana Kumbha expanded his kingdom at the expense of the sultanates of Malwa and Gujarat.

Sayyid Dynasty
The Delhi Sultanate took advantage of Rao Jodha's war with Rana Kumbha and captured several Rathore strongholds, including Nagaur, Jalore and Siwana. A few years later, Rao Jodha formed an alliance with several Rajput clans, including the Deora and Bhati, and attacked the Delhi army. He succeeded in capturing Merta, Phalodi, Pokran, Bhadrajun, Sojat, Jaitaran, Siwana, Nagaur and Godwar from the Delhi Sultanate. These areas were permanently captured from Delhi and became a part of Marwar.

Lodi Dynasty
Rajputs under Rana Sanga managed to defend and expand their confederation against Sultanates of Malwa, Gujarat and also against Ibrahim Lodi, Sultan of Delhi. Sanga defeated Ibrahim Lodi in two major battles at Khatoli and Dholpur. The Rana annexed Delhi territory up to Pilia Khar, a river on the outskirts Agra.

Gujarat Sultanate
Gujarat was ruled by Muzaffarid dynasty of Tanka Rajput origins from 1407 to 1573. The Kumbalgarh inscription states that Rana Kshetra Singh captured Zafar Khan, the Sultan of Patan (First Independent Sultan of Gujarat) in a battle.

Ahmad Shah II, the sultan of Gujarat, captured Sirohi and attacked Kumbhalmer in reaction to Rana Kumbha's meddling in the affairs of the Nagaur Sultanate. Mahmud Khalji, the Sultan of Malwa and Ahmad Shah II reached an agreement, the treaty of Champaner. Under this, they agreed to attack Mewar and divide the winnings. Ahmad Shah II captured Abu, but was unable to capture Kumbhalmer, and his advance towards Chittor was also blocked. Rana Kumbha allowed the army to approach Nagaur, when he came out, and after a severe engagement, inflicted a crushing defeat on the Gujarat army, annihilating it. Only remnants of it reached Ahmedabad, to carry the news of the disaster to the Sultan.

In a series of battles of Idar from 1514 to 1517, the forces of Rana Sanga of Mewar defeated the forces of Sultan of Gujarat. In 1520, Rana Sanga led a coalition of Rajput forces to invade Gujarat. He defeated the Sultan's army under the command of Nizam Khan and plundered the wealth of the Gujarat Sultanate. Muzaffar Shah II, the Sultan of Gujarat, fled to Champaner.

Rana also defeated the joint forces of Gujarat and Malwa Sultanates in the Siege of Mandsaur and the Battle of Gagron. In 1526, Rana gave protection to the fleeing Gujarat princes. The Sultan of Gujarat demanded their return and after the refusal from the Rana, sent his general Sharza Khan Malik Latif to bring the Rana to terms. In the battle that followed, Latif and 1700 of the Sultan's soldiers were killed, and the rest were forced to retreat to Gujarat.

Malwa Sultanate

Rana Kshetra Singh increased his fame by defeating the Sultan of Malwa and killing his general Ami Shah.

Sultan Mahmud Khilji sent his army with Sultan of Gujarat against Maharana Kumbha which was defeated by Kumbha at the Battle of Nagaur in 1455. Rana Kumbha further defeated Mahmud in Battle of Sarangpur, Sultan of Malwa was captured and was kept as a prisoner in Chittorgarh for six months. He was released after his assurance of future good behaviour. Rana kept his son as hostage to ensure this.

Rana Sanga defeated the joint forces of Gujarat and Malwa Sultanates in the Siege of Mandsaur and the Battle of Gagron.
Sanga's continued invasions in Malwa led to the complete destruction of the Malwa Sultanate and establishment of Rajput rule. 
Sanga placed Medini Rai as King of Malwa with capital at Chanderi. while Silhaditya Tomar establish himself as master of Raisen and Sarangpur region. According to historian Satish Chandra this events took place between 1518 and 1519.

After the victory and restoring Hindu rule in Malwa, Sanga ordered Rai to remove Jizya tax from Hindus of the region.

Nagaur Sultanate

The ruler of Nagaur, Firuz (Firoz) Khan died around 1453–1454. Shams Khan, his son, initially sought the help of Rana Kumbha against his uncle Mujahid Khan, who had occupied the throne. After Shams Khan became the Sultan of Nagaur with the help of Rana Kumbha, he refused to weaken his defenses as promised to Rana, and sought the help of Ahmad Shah II, the Sultan of Gujarat (Ahmad Shah died in 1442). Angered by this, Kumbha captured Nagaur in 1456, and also Kasili, Khandela and Sakambhari.

Rana Kumbha took away from the treasury of Shams Khan a large store of precious stones, jewels and other valuable things. He also carried away the gates of the fort and an image of Hanuman from Nagaur, which he placed at the principal gate of the fortress of Kumbhalgarh, calling it the Hanuman Pol. Nagaur Sultanate ceased to exist after this disaster.

Jaunpur Sultanate

In the eastern regions of the subcontinent, the Ujjainiya Rajputs of Bhojpur came into conflict with the Jaunpur Sultanate. After a prolonged struggle, the Ujjainiyas were driven into the forest where they continued to carry out a guerrilla resistance.

Mughal Empire
Taking advantage of the instability in Punjab, the ambitious Timurid prince, Babur invaded Hindustan and defeated Ibrahim Lodi at the First Battle of Panipat on 21 April 1526. Rana Sanga rallied a Rajput army to challenge Babur. Babur defeated the Rajputs at the Battle of Khanwa on 16 March 1527, with his superior techniques and military capabilities.

Rajputs at the rise of the Mughals

Soon after his defeat in 1527 at the Battle of Khanwa, Rana Sanga died in 1528. Bahadur Shah of Gujarat became a powerful Sultan. He captured Raisen in 1532 and defeated Mewar in 1533. He helped Tatar Khan to capture Bayana, which was under Mughal occupation. Humayun sent Hindal and Askari to fight Tatar Khan. At the battle of Mandrail in 1534, Tatar Khan was defeated and killed. Puranmal, the Raja of Amber, helped the Mughals in this battle. He was killed in this battle. Meanwhile, Bahadur Shah started his campaign against Mewar and led his army against the fort of Chittorgarh, the defense of the fort was led by, Rani Karnavati, widow of Rana Sanga, she started preparing for a siege and smuggled her young children to the safety of Bundi. Mewar was weakened due to constant struggles. After the Siege of Chittorgarh (1535), Rani Karnavati, together with other women, committed Jauhar. The fort was soon re-captured by the Sisodia's. Babur's grandson, Akbar, tried to persuade Mewar to accept Mughal sovereignty, like other Rajputs, but Rana Udai Singh refused. Ultimately Akbar besieged the fort of Chittor leading to the Siege of Chittorgarh (1567–1568). This time, Rana Udai Singh was persuaded by his nobles to leave the fort with his family. Jaimal Rathore of Merta and Fatah Singh of Kelwa were left to take care of the fort. On 23 February 1568, Akbar shot Jaimal Rathore with his musket, when he was looking after the repair work. That same night, the Rajput women committed jauhar (ritual suicide) and the Rajput men, led by the wounded Jaimal and Fateh Singh, fought their last battle. Akbar entered the fort, and at least 30,000 civilians were killed. Later Akbar placed a statue of these two Rajput warriors on the gates of Agra Fort.

Akbar and Rajputs

Mewar

Akbar won the fort of Chittorgarh, but Rana Udai Singh was ruling Mewar from other places. On 3 March 1572 Udai Singh died, and his son, Maharana Pratap, sat on the throne at Gogunda. He vowed that he would liberate Mewar from the Mughals; until then he would not sleep on a bed, would not live in a palace, and would not have food on a plate (thali). Akbar tried to arrange a treaty with Maharana Pratap, but did not succeed. Finally, he sent an army under Raja Man Singh in 1576. Maharana Pratap was defeated at the Battle of Haldighati in June 1576. However he  escaped from the battle and started guerrilla warfare with the Mughals . After years of struggling, Maharana Pratap was able to defeat the Mughals at the Battle of Dewair (not to be confused with the battle of Dewar which was fought by his son Rana Amar Singh). The Badgujars/Sikarwar were the main allies of the Ranas of Mewar. Maharana Pratap died on 19 January 1597, and Rana Amar Singh succeeded him. Akbar sent Salim to attack Mewar in October 1603, but he stopped at Fatehpur Sikri and sought permission from the emperor to go to Allahabad, and went there. In 1605 Salim sat on the throne and took the name of Jahangir.

Marwar
Chandrasen Rathore, the ruler of Marwar defended his kingdom for nearly two decades against relentless attacks from the Mughal Empire. Mughals were not able to establish their direct rule in Marwar during Chandrasen's lifetime.

Jahangir and Mewar
Jahangir sent an army under his son Parviz to attack Mewar in 1606 which was defeated in the Battle of Dewar. The Mughal emperor sent Mahabat Khan in 1608. He was recalled in 1609, and Abdulla Khan was sent. Then Raja Basu was sent, and Mirza Ajij Koka was sent. No conclusive victory could be achieved. The disunity among various Rajput clans didn't allow Mewar to be completely liberated. Ultimately Jahangir himself arrived at Ajmer in 1613, and appointed Shazada Khurram to capture Mewar. Khurram devastated the areas of Mewar and cut the supplies to the Rana. With the advice of his nobles and the crown prince, Karan Singh, the Rana sent a peace delegation to Prince Khurram, Jahangir's son. Khurram sought approval of the treaty from his father at Ajmer. Jahangir issued an order authorising Khurram to agree to the treaty. The treaty was agreed between Rana Amar Singh and Prince Khurram in 1615.
 The Rana of Mewar accepted Mughal suzereignty.
 Mewar and the fort of Chittorgarh was returned to Rana.
 The fort of Chittorgarh could not be repaired or renovated by Rana.
 The Rana of Mewar would not attend the Mughal court personally. The crown prince of Mewar would attend the court and give himself and his army to the Mughals.
 There would be no matrimonial alliance of Mewar with the Mughals.
 1500 Mewari soldiers to be sent under Mughal service whenever needed.
This treaty, considered respectable for mewar, ended the 88-year-long enmity between Mewar and the Mughals.

Aurangzeb and Rajput rebellion

The Mughal emperor Aurangzeb (1658–1707), who was far less tolerant of Hinduism than his predecessors, placed a Muslim on the throne of Marwar when the childless Maharaja Jaswant Singh died. This enraged the Rathores, and when Ajit Singh, Jaswant Singh's son, was born after his death, the Marwar nobles asked Aurangzeb to place Ajit on the throne. Aurangzeb refused, and tried to have Ajit assassinated. Durgadas Rathore and the dhaa maa (wet nurse) of Ajit, Goora Dhaa (the Sainik Kshatriya Gehlot Rajputs of Mandore), and others smuggled Ajit out of Delhi to Jaipur, thus starting the thirty-year Rajput rebellion against Aurangzeb. This rebellion united the Rajput clans, and a triple-pronged alliance was formed by the states of Marwar, Mewar, and Jaipur. One of the conditions of this alliance was that the rulers of Jodhpur and Jaipur should regain the privilege of marriage with the ruling Sisodia dynasty of Mewar, on the understanding that the offspring of Sisodia princesses should succeed to the throne over any other offspring.

Chhatrasal and the Bundelas
The Bundelas of Chhatrasal waged war against the Mughals and after leading a successful rebellion established his own kingdom which extended over most of the Bundelkhand.

See also
 History of Rajasthan
 List of battles of Rajasthan
 Timeline of history of Rajasthan
 List of Rajput dynasties and states

References

Bibliography
 
 
 
 
 
 

Military history of India
Rajput history
History of South Asia